Wilfred "Wilf" Adams (birth registered second quarter of 1934 – ) was an English professional rugby league footballer who played in the 1950s and 1960s.

Background
Wilf Adams' birth was registered in Pontefract district, West Riding of Yorkshire, England, and he died aged  in his sleep while at home in Wakefield, West Yorkshire, England.

Playing career

County Cup Final appearances
Wilf Adams played  left-, i.e. number 8, in Wakefield Trinity's 20-14 defeat by Leeds in the 1958 Yorkshire County Cup Final during the 1958–59 season at Odsal Stadium, Bradford on Saturday 18 October 1958.

Contemporaneous Article Extract
"Wilf Adams - Blind-side prop: Could be the choice to step into the injured Malcolm Sampson's role at No. 10. Signed from Streethouse Intermediates 1951. Regular choice during '53/4 and '58/9 seasons, but had only made six senior appearances (this season) when Trinity recalled him for the last league match ten days ago after successful work in the Reserves"

Genealogical information
Wilf Adams' marriage to June (née Smith) was registered during second ¼ 1955 in Pontefract district.

References

External links

Search for "Wilf" at rugbyleagueproject.org

1934 births
2000s deaths
English rugby league players
Rugby league props
Rugby league players from Pontefract
Wakefield Trinity players